The pararectal lymph nodes are lymph nodes that are in contact with the muscular coat of the rectum.

Structure 
The pararectal lymph nodes are located on the left and right of the rectum. Their efferent lymph ducts pass to the pre-aortic lymph nodes.

Function 
The pararectal lymph nodes drain the descending iliac and sigmoid parts of the large intestine, and the upper part of the rectum.

See also
 Pectinate line

References

External links
 http://anatomy.uams.edu/AnatomyHTML/lymph_pelvis&perineum.html

Lymphatics of the torso
Rectum